Fallis is a hamlet in central Alberta, Canada within Parkland County. Fallis is home to the St. Aidan and St. Hilda Anglican Church which is a registered historic place.

History 
The first post office at Fallis was established in 1910.  It was named for Mr. W.S. Fallis, an executive of the paint manufacturer, Sherwin Williams Company of Canada.

Demographics 
The population of Fallis according to the 2009 municipal census conducted by Parkland County is 54.

See also 
List of communities in Alberta
List of hamlets in Alberta

References 

Hamlets in Alberta
Parkland County